The Catholic Church in Albania is part of the worldwide Catholic Church, under the spiritual leadership of the Pope in Rome.

At the 2011 census, the percentage of Catholics was 10.03%. Catholicism is strongest in the northwestern part of the country, which historically had the most readily available contact with, and support from, Rome and the Republic of Venice. Shkodër is the center of Catholicism in Albania. More than 20,000 Albanian Catholics are located in Montenegro, mostly in Ulcinj, Bar, Podgorica, Tuzi, Gusinje and Plav. The region is considered part of the Malsia Highlander region of the seven Albanian Catholic tribes. The region was split from Ottoman Albania after the First Balkan War. There are also scattered Albanian Catholics in Kosovo and North Macedonia, with the greatest concentration being in the vicinity of Gjakova.

There are five dioceses in the country, including two archdioceses plus an Apostolic Administration covering southern Albania.

History
For four centuries, the Albanian Catholics have retained their faith with the aid of:

The Franciscan missionaries, especially since the middle of the 17th century, when persecutions by Muslim lords set in motion the apostasy of many Albanian villages.
The College of Propaganda at Rome, especially prominent in religious and moral support of Albanian Catholics. During the 17th and 18th centuries, particularly, it educated young clerics for service on the Albanian missions, contributing then as now to their support and to that of the churches.
The Austrian Government, which gave about five thousand dollars yearly to the Albanian missions, in its role of Protector of the Christian community under Turkish rule. Apropos of the Austrian interest in Albania, it may be stated that it is the Austrian ambassador who obtains from the Sultan the Berat, or civil document of institution, for the Catholic bishops of Albania.

The Church legislation of the Albanians was reformed by Pope Clement XI, effecting a general ecclesiastical visitation (1703) by the Archbishop of Antivari, at the close of which a national synod was held. Its decrees were printed by Propaganda (1705), and renewed in 1803. In 1872, Pius IX caused a second national synod to be held at Scutari, for the renovation of the popular and ecclesiastical life.

Organization

The country is currently split into two Ecclesiastical provinces each headed by Archbishops – Shkodër-Pult in the north and Tiranë-Durrës in the centre and south. Shkodrë-Pult has two suffragan Diocese for Lezhë and Sapë. Tiranë-Durrës has one suffragan Diocese for Rrëshen as well as metropolitan authority over the Byzantine Rite Apostolic Administration of Southern Albania, also known as the Albanian Greek-Catholic Church.

The first known Bishop of present-day Albania was Bassus, who was made Bishop of Scutari (Shkodër) in 387, suffragan to the Bishop of Thessaloniki, Primate of all Illyricum. In the 6th century, Shkodër became a suffrage of Ohrid, in the present-day North Macedonia, which was made the Primate of all Illyricum, and by the early Middle Ages, Shkodër was suffrage of the Bishop of Duklja, in present-day Montenegro. In 1867 Shkodër was united with the Archdiocese of Antivari (Bar, Montenegro), but split in 1886, to become a separate Archdiocese once again with suffragan bishops in Lezhë, Sapë and Pult.
The Diocese of Pult (Pulati) – a region north of Shkodër between the present day villages of Drisht and Prekal – dates back to 899, when a Bishop of Pult was appointed as a suffragan to the Bishop of Duklja. The Diocese was once divided into Greater Pult and Lesser Pult but eventually merged with Shkodër in 2005. Drisht, a village north of Shkodër, also used to be a separate Bishopric. The Diocese of Sapë (Sappa) – covering the region of Zadrima between Shkodër and Lezhë – dates back to 1062, and that of Lezhë (Alessio) to the 14th century.
The Archdiocese of Durrës was created in the 13th century, as the Bishopric of Albanopolis. It united with Tirana in 1992. The Diocese of Rrëshen was split off in 1996.

The Apostolic Administration of Southern Albania was created in 1939.

Other former ancient Diocese in Albania were Dinnastrum and Balazum.

Modern period 
The Albanian Catholic Church experienced a short-lived period of freedom after the fall of the Ottoman Empire, which ended when the Communist government took over, after World War II and, under Enver Hoxha, declared Albania the first officially atheist state in the world. Persecution of all religions was severe. "The Church was systematically persecuted and neither the structures nor the faithful were spared. Some churches were adapted to different uses. The cathedral in Shkoder, for example, was turned into a sports hall, and the cathedral in Durres was used as a puppet theatre. This persecution was almost unknown internationally, but it was one of the fiercest in Europe. Details only emerged following the fall of the regime in 1991. As the Pope said during his visit to Albania in 2014, these were 'decades of atrocious suffering and terrible persecution'."

On 26 November 2019, an earthquake struck Albania. The Catholic Church in Albania held Mass in its churches on 27 and 28 November for earthquake victims and coordinated its relief efforts through local branches of the Catholic charity Caritas.

According to Marco Mencaglia, project director for the Catholic charity Aid to the Church in Need, the Church in Albania faces many challenges: " The Church in Tirana, the capital, in the middle of the country, is particularly in need. There are very few diocesan priests. Pastoral work is carried out by religious communities, with very little means of support. To this one must add the internal migration of people who come from the north of the country in search of a better future in the capital. The south, which has a very small number of Catholics, can be considered first-mission territory, and a starting point for a new mission. Many brave missionaries have arrived in this region to begin new communities where the church was completely unknown."

Demographics

According to the 2011 Albanian census, 10.03% of the population affiliated with Catholicism, while 56.7% were Muslims, 13.79% undeclared, 6.75% Orthodox believers, 5.49% other, 2.5% Atheists, 2.09% Bektashis and 0.14% other Christians.

No clear statistics of any province of the former Ottoman empire have been compiled. What is known though is that before the independence of Albania, when the country had 1,500,000 inhabitants, the population's religious percentages were: 65% Muslim, 25% Albanian Orthodox Christian, and 10% Catholic. The CIA World Factbook uses the figures from the 1939 Census of 70% Muslim, 20% Eastern Orthodox Christian, and 10% Catholic.

Nonetheless, Catholic sources cite that statistics have changed significantly to this: 38.8% Muslim, 35.4% Christian (16.8% Catholic, 16.1% Orthodox Christian, 0.6% Protestant, 0.6% Independent), 16.6% Non-religious (9.0% Atheist), 0.2% Baha'i. The Catholic Church claims 525,000 members in a population of 3 million according to its count by diocese.

Geographical distribution 

As of 2011, Catholics constitute about 10.03% of the Albanian population. They form a majority in Lezhë County (72.38%) and the largest religious group in Shkodër County (47.19%).

Gallery

See also
Albanian Greek Catholic Church
Jesuits in Albania
Catholic Church by country
Christianity in Albania
Religion in Albania

 Episcopal Conference of Albania

Sources
William Martin Leake, Travels in Northern Greece (London, 1835)
Élisée Reclus, The Earth and its Inhabitants (New York, 1895, Eng. tr.): Europe, I, 115-126
Gustave Léon Niox, Péninsule des Balkans
Edith Durham, Travels
John Gardner Wilkinson, almatia and Montenegro (1848)
Herder, Konvers. Lex., s. v.
Ami Boué, la Turquie d'Europe (Paris, 1889)
Alexandre Degrand, Souvenirs de la Haute-Albanie (Paris, 1901)
Emanuele Portal, Note Albanesi (Palermo, 1903)

The documents of the medieval religious history of Albania are best found in the eight volumes of Daniele Farlati, Illyricum Sacrum (Venice, 1751–1819). See also Augustin Theiner, Vetera Monumenta Slavorum meridionalium historiam illustrantia (Rome, 1863 sqq.). Ecclesiastical statistics may be seen in O. Werner, Orbis Terrarum Catholicus (Freiburg, 1890), 122-124, and 120; also in the Missiones Catholicæ (Rome, Propaganda Press, triennially).

References